Montreuil-sur-Mer is a railway station on the line from Arras to Étaples via Saint-Pol-sur-Ternoise.  It is located in the commune of Montreuil-sur-Mer in the Pas-de-Calais department, France.  The station is served by TER Hauts-de-France trains between Étaples-Le Touquet and Arras via Saint-Pol-sur-Ternoise.

See also
List of SNCF stations in Hauts-de-France

References

Railway stations in Pas-de-Calais